Indefensible: The Truth About Edward Brannigan (also known as A Father's Betrayal) is a 1997 American drama television film. The film is directed by Brian Dennehy and stars Dennehy, Reed Diamond and Alice Krige. It first aired on November 25, 1997, on the CBS television network.

Plot
Edward "Eddie" Brannigan (Brian Dennehy), a prestigious veteran lawyer, gives a dinner party at his home to celebrate what for him is an honor: He's healed a relationship with his lawyer son Eddie Jr. (Reed Diamond) and will be working in his office. Eddie Sr. invites elementary school teacher Rebecca (Alice Krige), whom he had previously met, to the dinner party, and as the guests depart, Eddie Sr. and Rebecca are left alone on the couch. However, the guests soon return after hearing a commotion; they find a distraught Rebecca claiming that Eddie Sr. had raped her, which Eddie Sr. denies. After Rebecca files charges, Eddie Jr. initially can't believe what's being leveled at his father, until a talk with his mother and Eddie Sr.'s ex-wife Monica (Lynn Redgrave) reveals damning info. From then on, Eddie Sr.'s friends, neighbors and associates are split on whether they trust him or not.

Cast
Brian Dennehy as Edward "Eddie" Brannigan Sr.
Reed Diamond as Edward "Eddie" Brannigan Jr.
Alice Krige as Rebecca Daly
Michael David Simms as Allan "Al" Disanto
Lori Triolo as Katherine Trentini
Donnelly Rhodes as Jack Bailey
Lorena Gale as Cheryl Drew
Benjamin Ratner as Paul Suarez
Lynn Redgrave as Monica Brannigan
Addison Ridge as Matthew Daly
Nancy Kerr as Leslie
Jane Perry as Dr. Jan Royce
Nina Roman as Judge Holloway
Anne Farquhar as Priscilla Cunningham
Mark Brandon as Mitch Hayes
Kathryn Anderson 
Alf Humphreys as Father Lomax (as Alf Humphries)
Ken Camroux as Police Chief Harris
Kendall Cross as Susan

Production
The film was shot in Vancouver, British Columbia, Canada.

Reception
Writing for Radio Times, David Parkinson said of the film that "there are echoes here of Presumed Innocent," a film Dennehy had previously appeared in. "However," Parkinson added, "Dennehy's direction is far more perfunctory than that of Alan J. Pakula, although he still manages to sustain the attention as the case reveals unsuspected aspects of his life. Alice Krige is persuasive as the 'victim' and Lynn Redgrave solid as Dennehy's ex-wife." Carole Horst's summary of the film for Variety stated, "Slick, with a sharp script that harbors a couple of weak spots, and standout perfs from Alice Krige and Brian Dennehy, 'Indefensible: The Truth About Edward Brannigan' is a mouthful of a title but a sensitive study of the breakdown of archaic gender roles and date rape." In New York Magazine, John Leonard said, "Nothing new here except first-grade performances and some thumping style."

References

External links

1997 films
1997 television films
1997 drama films
CBS network films
1990s English-language films
American drama television films
1990s American films